Benjamin Joseph Wattenberg (born Joseph Ben Zion Wattenberg; August 26, 1933 – June 28, 2015) was an American author,  neoconservative political commentator and demographer,  associated with both Republican and Democratic presidents and politicians in the 1960s, ‘70s, and ‘80s.

National Affairs claimed that Wattenberg "challenged and reshaped conventional wisdom (...) at least once a decade".

Early life and education
Joseph Ben Zion Wattenberg was born on August 26, 1933, to Jewish immigrants from Eastern Europe in The Bronx. He grew up in the Sholem Aleichem Houses, which was built by Yiddish socialists in the 1920s, and attended DeWitt Clinton High School. In 1955, he graduated from Hobart College with a major in English. From 1955 to 1957, he was in the US Air Force, based in San Antonio. His first writing position was as a marine expert and edited Rivers & Harbors and Water Transportation Economics, and the McGraw-Hill Encyclopedia of Science and Technology.
In 1975, Hobart College awarded Wattenberg an honorary Doctor of Laws degree and gave the commencement address to the graduating class that year.

Career

Writing 
Wattenberg first came to national attention in 1965 with the book This U.S.A.: An Unexpected Family Portrait of 194,067,296 Americans Drawn From the Census co-authored with census director Richard M. Scammon. The authors utilized data from the 1960 Census to support the theory that the United States had entered a golden age by citing decreases in the rates of divorce, traffic deaths, drug addictions, and school dropouts as well as greater economic and educational opportunity for African Americans. Critics of the book cited the civil rights movement and the Vietnam War to call it propaganda of the American society. His process of layering data with narrative led to the creation of the term "data journalism." The publication caught the attention of Lyndon B. Johnson and Wattenberg became a White House speechwriter in 1966. He later became an advisor to Hubert Humphrey's 1970 Senate race and Senator Henry M. Jackson's contest for the 1972 Democratic presidential nomination, and Democratic Party presidential primaries of 1976, and served on the 1972 and 1976 Democratic National Convention platform committees.

In 1970, Wattenberg teamed up again with Richard M. Scammon to write The Real Majority. The authors analyzed electoral data including, the 1968 presidential election, polls, and surveys to argue that the American electorate was centrist, and that parties or candidates, to be viable, must appeal to the "real majority" of the electorate at the center. The real majority was described as “middle aged, middle class and middle minded” and therefore politicians ought to move to the middle to remain in touch with mainstream America. As a Democrat, Watternberg intended the analysis to be embraced by his party, instead the cultural touchstones of race, crime, and poverty were the basis of the campaign strategies of the Richard Nixon administration in the 1970 congressional elections and 1972 presidential election.

After the defeat of Senator George McGovern in 1972, Wattenberg helped found the Coalition for a Democratic Majority which focused on pocketbook issues and centrist themes to move the party back to the center. In 1978, he was sponsored by the American Enterprise Institute (AEI) in Washington, D.C. to publish the magazine Public Opinion. His 1984 book, The Good News Is the Bad News Is Wrong, suggested that the United States wasn't as troubled as the media and liberals proclaimed, despite economic and social upheaval.

In 1995, his book Values Matter Most drew the attention of President Bill Clinton which examined how centralist themes of the Republican party had helped win congressional victories of 1994. The publication also expressed concern at the waning of American values both abroad and at home but felt that the government could help cure the "culture of irresponsibility." In 1996, Henry Louis Gates, Jr., referred to the book as "the book that prompted Clinton’s infamous midnight-of-the-soul telephone call to the author."

As a senior fellow at AEI, he wrote The First Measured Century in 2001 with Theodore Caplow and Louis Hicks.

His published works helped popularize the term "psephology", the study of elections. He is credited with the introduction of the term “social issues” to the political lexicon.

Television commentator 
Wattenberg was the host of a number of PBS television specials, including Values Matter Most, The Grandchild Gap, America's Number One, Ben Wattenberg's 1980, The Stockholder Society, A Third Choice (about the role of third parties in American politics), Heaven on Earth: The Rise and Fall of Socialism, and The Democrats. He hosted the weekly PBS television program, Think Tank with Ben Wattenberg, from 1994 to 2010, and previously hosted PBS series In Search of the Real America and Ben Wattenberg At Large.

Personal life
Wattenberg was the son of real-estate attorney Judah Wattenberg and Rachel Gutman Wattenberg, and he was the younger brother of actress Rebecca Schull. He had four children, Ruth, Daniel and Sarah with his first wife, the former Marna Hade who died in 1997, and Rachel with his second wife, Diane Abelman. Wattenberg died on June 28, 2015, from complications following surgery.

Bibliography
 This U.S.A., 1965
 The Real Majority: An Extraordinary Examination of the American Electorate, 1970
 The Real America, 1974
 Against All Enemies: A Novel, co-authored with Ervin S. Duggan 1977
 The Good News is, the Bad News is Wrong, 1984
 The Birth Dearth, 1987
 The First Universal Nation, 1991
 Values Matter Most, 1995
 The First Measured Century: An Illustrated Guide to Trends in America 1900–2000, co-authored with Theodore Caplow and Louis Hicks, 2000
 Fewer: How the New Demography of Depopulation Will Shape Our Future, 2004
 Fighting Words: A Tale of How Liberals Created Neo-Conservatism, 2008

Filmography
 Heaven on Earth: The Rise and Fall of Socialism (2005)

References

External links
 
 Official PBS Think Tank Page
 Ben Wattenberg Archive of columns published on Jewish World Review.
 American Enterprise Institute Bio Page
 
 Open to Greatness: We need immigrants
 Memo to Ben Wattenberg: The Good News Is The Bad News Is Wrong Critique of Wattenberg's fertility analysis.
 John Kerry Is Wrong: Vietnam vs. Iraq
 Booknotes interview with Wattenberg on The First Universal Nation, January 6, 1991.

1933 births
2015 deaths
American demographers
American Enterprise Institute
American male journalists
American political commentators
American political writers
American television journalists
Hobart and William Smith Colleges alumni
Jewish American writers
PBS people
Writers from the Bronx
New York (state) Democrats
Journalists from New York City
Mathematicians from New York (state)
21st-century American Jews